Gary J. Bass is an American author and academic. He is an associate professor of international relations at the Princeton School of Public and International Affairs of Princeton University.

Bass graduated from Harvard University with a BA and PhD.  Bass is a professor at Princeton University, where he teaches politics and international relations. His book, The Blood Telegram, was a Pulitzer prize non-fiction finalist in 2014. The winner that year was the Toms River: A Story of Science and Salvation written by Dan Fagin. His book was about the 1971 Bangladesh genocide. The Council on Foreign Relations awarded the book the Arthur Ross Book Award. It also won the Lionel Gelber Prize and the Cundill Prize. He is a former reporter of The Economist.

Bass has written articles for the New York Times. He has written for The Harvard Crimson. He has also written for the Foreign Policy. He has written for The New Yorker and The Boston Globe. He has written for the New Republic. He has written for The Atlantic.

Bibliography 

 The Blood Telegram: Nixon, Kissinger, and a Forgotten Genocide, Alfred A. Knopf, 2013. (nominated for the Pulitzer Prize)
 Freedom’s Battle: The Origins of Humanitarian Intervention, Alfred A. Knopf, 2009.
 Stay the Hand of Vengeance: The Politics of War Crimes Tribunals, Princeton University Press, 2002.

References 

Living people
Princeton University faculty
American writers
American historians
Year of birth missing (living people)
Harvard College alumni
Harvard University alumni